Blair Drummond Safari Park is a family visitor attraction located near Stirling in Scotland. It opened to the public on 15 May 1970 and is home to over 350 animals, many of which roam freely or are kept in large enclosures in the  estate. The Safari Park is open from mid March until the end of December each year.

History

The original Blair Drummond House was built in 1715. Sir John Kay, a tea merchant from Glasgow, purchased the house and its surrounding land in 1916. Because he had no sons, Kay passed the property to his nephew Sir John Muir, the grandfather of the park's present owner Jamie Muir. The house was a family home until it was sold to the Camphill Movement, a charity that cares for people with special needs, in 1977. The current Blair Drummond House was built in a new location in 1872 by James Campbell Walker, and again in 1923 by James Bow Dunn after a fire destroyed the previous house.

Blair Drummond Safari Park was opened in 1970, with the help of Jimmy Chipperfield, one of Britain's first safari parks (Longleat Safari Park being the first, in 1966).

Controversy
In June 2021, Born Free called for an investigation of the park over animal deaths.

The reserves

African reserve 
The first reserve features non-carnivorous native African species, such as Grant's zebra, Ankole-Watusi cattle, Guineafowl, Lechwe, Kudu and the Southern white rhinoceros.  The rhinos are part of a Europe-wide breeding programme which began in 2004 with the arrival of three young rhinos from Kruger National Park: Dorothy (Dot), Graham and Jane.  Dorothy and Graham have gone on to have five calves: in 2007, 2009, 2012 and 2014.

Lion reserve
The second reserve is home solely to African lions. They are also part of a Europe-wide breeding programme, with two of the females having been born in the park. There is currently one male, Zulu, introduced in February 2016 through an exchange with Wildlands Adventure Zoo Emmen to ensure genetic diversity is maintained.

Barbary macaque reserve
The optional third reserve, "Monkey Jungle", was opened to the public in 2015 and houses solely Barbary macaques.  The monkeys were transferred to the park from Gibraltar in 2014 to reduce the problem they were beginning to cause to the peninsula's residents, and to prevent having to cull them as had been carried out previously. The Barbary macaque is listed as endangered by the IUCN Red List and in 2016 the park began to raise money for Barbary macaques being exploited for use as photo props in Morocco.

Asian reserve
The fourth and final reserve houses herbivorous species native to Asia, such as Père David's deer, Bactrian camels, Nilgai, Axis deer and Eld's deer. In April 2016 the park welcomed the birth of two Père David's deer, a species now extinct in the wild.

The park

The following areas and attractions can be found in the park:

Chimp Island
The Boat Safari next to Lemur Land took visitors to view Chimp Island - an island home to a family of chimpanzees. The boat trips aren't running anymore and visitors have to take a path instead.

Elephants
The current elephant enclosure was opened by the Princess Royal in 2013, and was commended in the British and Irish Association of Zoos and Aquariums' annual awards in the category "best new habitat".

Dinosaurs
In 2020, a dinosaur exhibit was opened. The dinosaurs were constructed with steel frame and silicone skin.  They make movements and noises.

Other activities

Rides and amusements
The park has a large slide and playground, where visitors will find a pirate ship and adventure fort. They are all housed within a sand pit  part of which is under cover to offer shelter in wet weather. Near the sea lion building is the large slide, and near the boat safari there are pedal boats and a flying fox.  Other rides and attractions including dodgems, a kids' dragon rollercoaster, a bouncy castle, face painting and a carousel.

Eating at the park
There is a restaurant and several snack outlets, and picnic tables are available for visitors who bring their own food and drinks. Visitors can also bring their own BBQ food and safari park will supply and light a Barbecue at no charge.

Notes

External links

Safari parks
Zoos in Scotland
Tourist attractions in Stirling (council area)
1970 establishments in Scotland
Zoos established in 1970